San Carlos High School is a high school in San Carlos, Arizona. It is part of the San Carlos Unified School District, which also includes a primary and intermediate school together known as Rice Elementary.

Public high schools in Arizona
Schools in Gila County, Arizona